L'Interdit was a perfume created in 1957 by Hubert de Givenchy. The word interdit is French for "forbidden." The parfumeur behind this feminine aldehydic-floral fragrance was Francis Fabron (1913–2005). It has a delicate, floral, powdery aroma. It contains notes of rose, jasmine, violet and, at the heart, a blend of woods and grasses.

Givenchy created the perfume for Audrey Hepburn, who wore it for a year before its release to the public. Hepburn also became the first actress to become the face of a perfume, for L'Interdit.

Creation 
The Interdit was secretly created in 1954 and was worn only by actress Audrey Hepburn, to whom it was given as a gift by Hubert de Givenchy, who had dressed her. For this, he called on a laboratory in Grasse, Roure Bertrand Dupont (nowadays Givaudan), who started with a base of aldehydes, reminiscent of the smell of chic dry cleaners, being a typical perfume of the 1950s, where one begins to use for the juices of the odors of the functional universe. In those years, perfumers also often used bouquets of scents, whereas nowadays the notes are more linear. L'Interdit thus includes tonka bean in the base note. Olfactologist at Givenchy, Françoise Donche notes that “without being sulphurous, L'Interdit evokes a passionate seduction. The mischievous side of the top notes turns out to be quite sensual in the end, the carnation is not so demure and the clove, a burning spice, brings a clearly intoxicating touch”. It is part of the “floral aldehyde” family.

In 1957, Hubert de Givenchy decided to market the perfume, to which Audrey Hepburn replied: “But I forbid you”. The star finally lifts his ban and participates in this to give the name to the perfume.

Success 
L'Interdit quickly became successful with 4000 sales in its first days; a promising figure considering, at the time, it was only sold in France.

References

External links
 L'Interdit at Basenotes.net
 L'Interdit at Fragrantica.com
 Advertisement with Hepburn

Perfumes
Products introduced in 1957
20th-century perfumes